The August F. Poehler House is a historic house in Henderson, Minnesota, United States.  It was built in 1884 for shopowners August and Emilie Poehler and their six children.  Since 1949 the house has served as the Sibley County Historical Society Museum.

The Poehler House was listed on the National Register of Historic Places in 1982 for its local significance in the themes of architecture and commerce.  It was nominated for its association with August Poehler, an early and influential settler in Henderson, and for exemplifying the fine residences built by the area's successful entrepreneurs in the second half of the 19th century.

See also
 List of museums in Minnesota
 National Register of Historic Places listings in Sibley County, Minnesota

References

External links

 Sibley County Historical Society and Museum

1884 establishments in Minnesota
Buildings and structures in Sibley County, Minnesota
History museums in Minnesota
Houses on the National Register of Historic Places in Minnesota
National Register of Historic Places in Sibley County, Minnesota
Queen Anne architecture in Minnesota